Tiago Rafael Moreira da Rocha (born 4 September 1990 in Penafiel) is a  Portuguese professional footballer who plays for Vila Meã as a goalkeeper.

External links
 
 
 Tiago Rocha at ZeroZero

1990 births
Living people
People from Penafiel
Portuguese footballers
Association football goalkeepers
Primeira Liga players
Liga Portugal 2 players
F.C. Penafiel players
AC Vila Meã players
Sportspeople from Porto District